Bruno Messerli (17 September 1931, in Belp – 4 February 2019) was a Swiss geographer and university professor who focused on high mountains and highland-lowland linkages.  He was appointed Full Professor of Geomorphology in 1968 by the University of Bern, where he taught and carried out research until his retirement in 1996.  He contributed significantly to the inclusion of a mountain agenda, Chapter 13 — Managing Fragile Ecosystems — Sustainable Mountain Development  in Agenda 21, the official action plan of the
United Nations Conference on Environment and Development (UNCED), also known as the Rio de Janeiro Earth Summit, the Rio Summit, the Rio Conference, and the Earth Summit,  held in Rio de Janeiro from 3 to 14 June in 1992.

Education

Bruno Messerli completed his doctorate at the University of Bern in 1962.  His doctoral research concerned the geomorphology of the Sierra Nevada in Andalusia, Spain. His post-doctoral Habilitation thesis concerned Quaternary glaciation of mountain ranges around the Mediterranean basin.

Career

Dr. Messerli became a full professor of geography at the University of Bern in 1968. From 1978 to 1983 he served as Director of the Institute of Geography, and as Rector of the university from 1986 to 1987. In 1996 he became Professor Emeritus. Messerli was as President of the International Geographical Union (IGU) from 1996 to 2000.  From 1996 to 2001 he served as Co-Director of the International Geosphere-Biosphere Programme’s project on Past Global Changes (PAGES),  founded by Messerli's friend and colleague at the University of Bern, Hans Oeschger.

Messerli worked on the United Nations University's  Himalayan Highland-Lowland Interactive Project together with Professor Jack D. Ives. He was a principal founder of International Centre for Integrated Mountain Development (ICIMOD), a intergovernmental agency located in Kathmandu, Nepal, and dedicated to interdisciplinary research on mountain systems. With Jack Ives, also, Messerli was one of the handful of montologists advocating for the Mountain Agenda in the 1992 Rio Declaration on Environment and Development (Chapter 13 in Agenda 21: Managing Fragile Ecosystems: Sustainable Mountain Development). He was a founder of the International Centre for Integrated Mountain Development (ICIMOD) in Nepal and of the Mountain Research Initiative (MRI), based in Switzerland. He had a long collaboration with the UN's Food and Agriculture Organization (FAO), which supervises the Mountain Agenda.

Awards
1988: Global 500 Roll of Honour of the United Nations Environment Programme (UNEP) 
1990: Marcel Benoist Prize
2002: King Albert I Gold Medal
2002: Founder's Medal of the Royal Geographical Society
2002: FAO - Medal for the UN - International Year of Mountains, Global Mountain Summit in Bishkek, Kyrghyzstan

Works
with H. Oeschger and M. Svilar (ed.): Das Klima—Analysen und Modelle Geschichte und Zukunft. [Climate: Analysis and Models, History and Future] Berlin, Heidelberg, New York, 1980. Springer‐Verlag.
with JD Ives(ed.): Mountain Ecosystems, Stability and Instability . Spec. Publ. IGU Congress Paris - Alps 1984. Mountain Research and Development
with E. Brugger, G. Furrer and P. Messerli (ed.): Upheaval in the mountain area. The development of the Swiss mountain area between independence and dependence from an economic and ecological point of view . Main publishing house, Berne 1984.
with JD Ives: 
with JD Ives 
with T. Hofer: Floods in Bangladesh. History, Dynamics and Rethinking the Role of the Himalayas . United Nations University Press, Tokyo / New York 2006.

References

1931 births
2019 deaths
Swiss geographers
Presidents of the International Geographical Union
Recipients of the Vautrin Lud International Geography Prize
Academic staff of the University of Bern
Foreign Members of the Russian Academy of Sciences
Recipients of the Royal Geographical Society Founder's Medal